Solo is the eleventh album by the Portuguese music composer António Pinho Vargas. It was released in 2008.

Track listing

Personnel
 António Pinho Vargas - piano

António Pinho Vargas albums
2008 albums